Rohaan Bhattacharjee is an Indian actor, who works in Bengali film and television. He is known for his portrayal as Gobindo in the TV serial Bhojo Gobindo, a romance comedy drama show which was aired on Star Jalsha.

He has also appeared in Koler Bou and now he is working on Aparajita Apu, a television series which airs on Zee Bangla.

Television
 Bhojo Gobindo as Gobindo/Bhojo
 Koler Bou as Deep Narayan 
 Aparajita Apu as Dipu

Reality shows
 Ebar Jombe Moja as an Anchor
  Dance Bangla Dance 11 as Guest performer.
 Dance Dance Junior Season 3 as mentor.

Movies
 Love Diary Ek Prem Katha
 Mon Sudhu Toke Chai
 Jal
 Jamaibaran
 Blackmail
 Bajikar
 Nil Logot

References

External links
 

Living people
Bengali male television actors
Indian male actors
Year of birth missing (living people)